The Restoration of Chaos & Order is the fourth album released by American punk rock band Against All Authority.

Track listing
 "The Restoration of Chaos & Order"
 "Sweet Televised Destruction"
 "All Ages Show Tonight"
 "Collecting Scars"
 "Radio Waves"
 "Silence Is Golden but Duct Tape Is Silver"
 "Shut It Down"
 "Sunshine Fist Magnet"
 "I Just Wanna Start a Circle Pit"
 "War Machine Breakdown"
 "Grinding My Life Away"
 "The Production of Self Destruction"
 "Buried Alive"
 "Best Enemy"
 "Holiday in Cambodia" (Vinyl exclusive)

Personnel 
 Danny Lore - Vocals/Bass
 Joe Koontz - Guitar/Vocals

References

Against All Authority albums
2006 albums
Hopeless Records albums